Zarcinia is a genus of insects in the family Plutellidae.

Species
Zarcinia melanozestas Meyrick, 1935
Zarcinia nigrosignatella Chrétien, 1915
Zarcinia sacra Meyrick, 1925
Zarcinia teleogramma (Meyrick, 1923)
Zarcinia thiospila Turner, 1903
Zarcinia triexoda (Meyrick, 1923)
Zarcinia vulnerosa (Diakonoff, 1955)

References

Plutellidae